Harizanov is a surname. Notable people with the surname include:

Nikolay Harizanov (born 1983), Bulgarian footballer
Valentina Harizanov, Serbian-American mathematician

Bulgarian-language surnames